Asthenotricha inutilis is a moth in the family Geometridae first described by William Warren in 1901. It is found in Cameroon, the Democratic Republic of the Congo, Kenya, South Africa, Tanzania and Uganda.

References

Moths described in 1901
Asthenotricha
Moths of Africa